Malik Ghulam Rasool Sangha is a Pakistani politician who has been a member of the Provincial Assembly of the Punjab since August 2018.

Political career

He was elected to the Provincial Assembly of the Punjab as an independent candidate from Constituency PP-83 (Khushab-II) in the 2018 Pakistani general election.

He joined Pakistan Tehreek-e-Insaf (PTI) following his election. He was unseated due to a vote against party policy for the Chief Minister of Punjab election on 16 April 2022.

References

Living people
Punjab MPAs 2018–2023
Pakistan Tehreek-e-Insaf MPAs (Punjab)
Year of birth missing (living people)